HMS Rocket was an R-class destroyer of the Royal Navy that saw service during Second World War.  Built by Scotts Shipbuilding and Engineering Company in Greenock, Scotland, she was launched in October 1942 and commissioned in August 1943.

Service

Second World War
During the Battle of Sept-Îles, Rocket encountered German torpedo boats in the English Channel in October 1943, an action in which the cruiser  and destroyer  were lost. The latter was sunk by Rocket after she became disabled, to avoid her falling into enemy hands.  On 29 November 1943 HMS Rocket and HMS Tumult, sank U-86 east of the Azores, in position 40°52'N, 18°54'W, by depth charges. Arriving in the Indian Ocean in January 1944, Rocket participated in the shelling of Sabang (25 July 1944) and of the Andaman Islands (February and March 1945).

Post-War

In 1946 Rocket was at Chatham and between 1946 and 1948 she was used as an air target ship at Rosyth. In 1949 she was placed into reserve at Portsmouth. Between July 1949 and 1951 she was converted at Devonport Dockyard into a Type 15 fast anti-submarine frigate, with the new pennant number F193.

On 18 May 1951 she was re-commissioned for the 3rd Training Squadron, based in Derry. In 1953 she took part in the Fleet Review to celebrate the Coronation of Queen Elizabeth II. In September 1953, the ship was sabotaged, with leads to the port Telemotor of the steering gear cut. A stoker pleaded guilty to charges of damaging the ship under the Malicious Damage Act 1861 and was sentenced to four years imprisonment and dismissal from the navy with disgrace. In 1954 she returned to reserve at Rosyth, before being re-commissioned the following year.  In November 1956 she returned to reserve at Chatham, then transferred to the reserve at Portsmouth the following year.  On 28 October 1960 she was re-commissioned at Portsmouth and sailed to the Far East to join the 6th Frigate Squadron.

Decommissioning and disposal
Rocket returned to Portsmouth on 11 May 1962 and de-commissioned. She was finally scrapped at Dalmuir in March 1967.

References

Publications
 
 
 
 
Marriott, Leo, Royal Navy Destroyers Since 1945. Ian Allan, 1989.

Further reading

Q and R-class destroyers of the Royal Navy
Ships built on the River Clyde
1942 ships
World War II destroyers of the United Kingdom
Type 15 frigates